Gurdwara Sri Guru Singh Sabha Southall (SGSS) is a Sikh gurdwara situated on Guru Nanak Road and Park Avenue, Southall, in the London Borough of Ealing. It is the largest Sikh temple in London. Building work at the Havelock Road site commenced in March 2000 and the gurdwara opened on Sunday 30 March 2003, in order to accommodate Southall's growing Sikh community. The gurdwara cost £17.5 million to build. It was funded by donations from members of the local Sikh community.

Sikh school
In a bid to improve and advance the education of Sikh pupils, the gurdwara set up a brand new Sikh school – the Khalsa School. This school caters for children of Sikh parents as well as children of other faiths. It is located at Norwood Hall, Tentelow Lane, Southall and was purchased for £2.8 million from Ealing, Hammersmith and West London College.

Presidency
The current Gurdwara president is Himmat Singh Sohi.

See also
 Sikhism in the United Kingdom

Notes

External links

 Gurdwara Sri Guru Singh Sabha Southall official website

2000s establishments in England
Gurdwaras in London
Religion in the London Borough of Ealing
Southall
21st-century gurdwaras
Singh Sabha movement